Michael Franzese (né Grillo; born May 27, 1951) is an American former mobster who was a caporegime in the Colombo crime family, and son of former underboss Sonny Franzese. Franzese was enrolled in a pre-med program at Hofstra University, but dropped out to make money for his family after his father was sentenced to 50 years in prison for bank robbery in 1967. He eventually helped implement a scheme to defraud the federal government out of gasoline taxes in the early 1980s.

By the age of 35, in 1986, Fortune Magazine listed Franzese as number 18 on its list of the "Fifty Most Wealthy and Powerful Mafia Bosses". Franzese had claimed that at the height of his career, he generated up to $8 million per week. In 1986, he was sentenced to 10 years in prison on conspiracy charges, released in 1989, rearrested in 1991 for a parole violation, and ultimately released in 1994. Soon after, he retired to California and is now a motivational speaker and writer.

Early life 
Franzese was born on May 27, 1951, in the Brooklyn borough of New York City, to John "Sonny" Franzese, a Colombo crime family underboss, and Cristina Capobianco-Franzese, although Michael had initially questioned his actual biological father. Franzese had initially believed that he had been adopted by John after his mother divorced Frank Grillo, whom Franzese thought to be his biological father. Michael says he had gone by the name "Michael Grillo" until he was 18 years old. However, it was later discovered that John, already married with three children, had gotten the 16-year-old Capobianco, a cigarette girl at the Stork Club in Manhattan, pregnant with Michael, so Capobianco married Grillo to avoid having a scandal surrounding having a child out of wedlock. After the mob allowed John to divorce his first wife, Grillo disappeared, and he married Capobianco.

Franzese later moved to Long Island. After 
in 1969; his father originally did not want him to be involved in organized crime. However, in 1971, Franzese decided to drop out of college to help his family earn money when his father was sentenced to 50 years in prison for bank robbery in 1967.

Franzese became acquainted with his father's friends such as Joseph Colombo, and according to Franzese, later became inducted as a made man on Halloween night 1975 under acting boss Tommy DiBella. As part of the ceremony Franzese took the blood oath and swore omerta. He took the oath alongside friend Jimmy Angelino, Joseph Peraino Jr., Salvatore Miciotta, Vito Guzzo Sr., and John Minerva — all of whom except Miciotta died violently over the next 20 years. Although Franzese recounts this ceremony had taken place in 1975, the membership books reportedly were not reopened until 1976 (they had been closed since 1957).

Franzese was briefly mentored by Colombo soldier Joseph "Joe-Joe" Vitacco (1927–1980). During the late 1970s, Franzese met with Gambino crime family boss John Gotti, who was then a soldier. Angelo Ruggiero was also present. Franzese was contacted by a flea market owner who complained that his partner was using and selling drugs at the market in Bay Ridge, Brooklyn. Franzese agreed to frighten him and become the new partner. Franzese sent Colombo soldier-turned informant Anthony Sarivola and another member who remains unidentified. Gotti however claimed that the scared-off partner was an associate of his. Franzese later expressed admiration for Gotti, citing his strict mobster lifestyle and his overwhelming ego.

In 1980, Franzese had become a caporegime of a crew of 300.

Gasoline bootlegging 
In 1981, Franzese was contacted by Lawrence Salvatore Iorizzo who had developed a scheme to defraud the federal government out of gasoline taxes in 1985. Iorizzo was being hassled by criminals in California and offered Franzese a percentage if he would defend and solve the issue. The pair set up 18 stock-bearer companies based in Panama. Under law at the time in Panama, gasoline could be sold tax-free from one wholesale company to the next. Franzese partnered with the Russian Mafia in Brooklyn in the gas scheme. The wholesale gas was sold to one company, but shipped to another company while a third company, a dummy company, was sold the gasoline on paper and would forge tax documents for the company that received the gasoline. Franzese's crew was then able to collect and pocket the nine cents per gallon of gasoline in federal tax. Once enforcement agents attempt to collect the tax from the dummy company, it declares bankruptcy and the daisy chain would continue. This gasoline supplied between one third and one half of all gasoline sold in the New York metropolitan area. According to officials, Franzese kept 75 percent of the profits, making $1.26 million per month, while Iorizzo made $45,000 per month. An associate later testified that Franzese personally made $1 million per week from the gas scheme.

Franzese had claimed that at the height of his career, he generated up to $8 million per week. Revenue officials estimated $250 million in gasoline tax was stolen in New York state per year, before moving on to Florida which was estimated to have lost $40 million to $250 million in stolen gasoline tax. Authorities believe the money was laundered through Franzese's film production company, Miami Gold, to offshore bank accounts in Austria and Panama. Franzese bought a home in Delray Beach, Florida.

In 1986, Fortune Magazine listed Franzese as number 18 on its list of the "Fifty Most Wealthy and Powerful Mafia Bosses". Vanity Fair cited him as one of the biggest money earners for the mafia since Al Capone. He was referred to as the "Yuppie Don" in the 1980s, and as "Prince of the Mafia".

Entertainment, sports management and other businesses 
During the 1970s, he began to enter the world of legitimate business and by the mid 1980s Franzese had a stronghold on various businesses such as car dealerships, leasing companies, auto repair shops, restaurants, nightclubs, a contractor company, movie production and distribution companies, travel agencies and video stores.

By 1980, Franzese was a partner with booking agent Norby Walters in his firm. Franzese's role was to intimidate existing and prospective clients. Franzese would later testify he provided the initial $50,000 to Walters to start his agency booking company with a 25% share of any profits. Additionally, Franzese would assist with any entertainers Walters had problems with by meeting their agents. In 1981, Franzese successfully extorted a role for Walters in the US tour by singer Michael Jackson and his brothers. In 1982, the manager for singer Dionne Warwick wanted to drop Walters as an agent; Franzese met with the manager and persuaded him to keep Walters.

In 1983, the FBI launched an investigation into boxing promoter Don King's organized crime connections and targeted Franzese to introduce an FBI undercover agent, using the alias Victor Quintana, to King. Franzese, who had never met King, says he was introduced to him by civil rights leader Al Sharpton. Franzese claimed he first met Sharpton through the Genovese crime family mobster Daniel Pagano. Quintana was to give the impression that he was buying his way into the boxing world in order for King to reveal his criminal associations, however the investigation subsequently collapsed after Quintana failed to follow through with several hundred thousand dollars.

In 1985, Walters set up a sports management agency with Franzese as a silent partner. At a meeting he agreed to hand over $50,000 in return for a 25 percent interest from the sports agency.

Franzese was the president of Miami Gold, a film production company that produced the 1986 film Knights of the City.

Indictment and prison 
In April 1985, Franzese was acquitted of racketeering charges. In another case in December 1985, Franzese was charged in both Florida and New York in regards to counterfeiting and extortion from the gasoline bootlegging racket. In New York, Franzese was one of nine people indicted on 14 counts. In Florida, Franzese was one of 26 people indicted on 177 counts after a 16 month investigation in Florida called "Operation Tiger Tail".

Iorizzo, who was already sentenced to five years and ordered to pay $1.7 million for his role in the theft of $1.1 million in gas taxes and placed in the witness protection program, began testifying against Franzese and others in their operation in March 1985. On March 21, 1986, Franzese pleaded guilty to one count of racketeering conspiracy and one count of tax conspiracy. Franzese was sentenced to 10 years in prison and ordered to pay $14.7 million in restitution on the federal charges, agreeing to sell his assets including a mansion in Old Brookville, New York, the Miami Gold production company, and use proceeds from the Knights of the City film. He then reached a plea agreement and was sentenced to nine years in prison for state racketeering charges in Florida which would run concurrently with his previous conviction. He also was ordered to pay an additional $3 million in restitution to the state of Florida.

Franzese was subpoenaed to testify at Walters' trial in March 1989, as Walters had invoked his name to frighten college athletes into signing management contracts, including Maurice Douglass. In exchange for his testimony, he was given immunity from prosecution in the Walters case. Walters was found guilty, fined $395,000 and given a sentence of 5 years with the judge in the case citing the importance of Franzese's testimony. After Walters conviction, Franzese was released from prison on parole after serving 43 months. In September 1990, Walter's conviction was overturned by the 7th Circuit Court of Appeals citing a technicality.

On December 27, 1991, Franzese was sentenced in New York to four years in federal prison for violating the probation requirements from his 1989 release. Franzese had been arrested in Los Angeles on a tax fraud accusation and was sent back to New York for the probation hearing. In court, prosecutors complained that Franzese had only started paying the balance of his court-ordered restitution payments earlier that year. The prosecutor said that "Mr. Franzese has led the Government on a long, merry chase for a number of years," adding. “He gave us nothing of value about anyone in Cosa Nostra. 
We essentially view him as a con man." Prosecutors said that Franzese was no longer considered by the government to be a federal cooperating witness because of his parole violations.

In 1990, Franzese was portrayed by Joseph Bono in the Martin Scorsese film Goodfellas (1990). While imprisoned in 1991, Franzese became a born-again Christian after he was given a Bible by a prison guard. He also spent time in solitary confinement.

In 1992, Franzese co-authored his first book, an autobiography, Quitting the Mob. In the book, Franzese discusses his criminal activities, life with his father, and meeting his second wife, Camille Garcia.

After prison 
He was released on November 7, 1994, retiring from the mob in 1995 by moving to California with his wife and children; the relocation was also a result of receiving multiple death threats and contracts on his life, including one approved by his father.

Since his release in 1994, Franzese has publicly renounced and denounced the life of organized crime, stating "I never glamorize my mob life. It's an evil life", and "I don't know one family that's part of that life [mob life] that hasn't been totally devastated". He has since become a motivational speaker for youth, at schools, prisons, and other venues. He also speaks at Christian conferences and churches, including Willow Creek Community Church, in 2016.

On July 23, 2002, while appearing on the HBO television program Real Sports with Bryant Gumbel, Franzese claimed that during the 1970s and 1980s, he persuaded New York Yankees players who owed money to Colombo loansharks to fix baseball games for betting purposes. The Yankees organization immediately denied Franzese's accusations.

In April 2013, a documentary called The Definitive Guide To The Mob was released by Lionsgate, with Franzese as commentator. Later in 2013, he appeared in Inside the American Mob, a National Geographic documentary.

In March 2015, he appeared in a two-part documentary on the American Mafia with television presenter and reporter Trevor McDonald. He spoke about his wealth, but also the impact of being a member of the Colombo crime family had on his family, and that was why he turned away from organized crime.

In 2017, he played a reformed mobster in the Kevin Sorbo film Let There Be Light.

Franzese hosted a stage musical, A Mob Story, at the Plaza Hotel & Casino in Las Vegas. The show opened in October 2018 and was created and directed by Jeff Kutash.

In 2019, Franzese became co-founder of a national franchise of pizza restaurants called "Slices Pizza". Slices serves Sicilian style square pizzas with ingredients sourced from Naples and Campania, with ovens from Venice. The franchise started in California, and includes five branches across the country including Dallas, Texas.

In July 2020, he appeared in the Fear City: New York vs The Mafia Netflix docuseries.

Franzese released an autobiographical biopic, God The Father, in 2014, which was released in theaters across 20 cities in the United States. The film uses a combination of stock footage, animated recreations, as well as interviews to tell his life story. It cites religion as the motivation for Franzese changing his life.

In June 2020, Franzese started a YouTube channel. On his channel he tells stories about his past life, makes interviews and reviews mafia related films, television shows, and video games and analyzes their accuracy. His subscriber count exceeded 1,000,000 in January 2023.

Franzese is the author of seven books: Quitting the Mob (1992), Blood Covenant (2003), The Good, the Bad and the Forgiven (2009), I'll Make You an Offer You Can't Refuse (2011), From the Godfather to God the Father (2014), Blood Covenant: The Story of the "Mafia Prince" Who Publicly Quit the Mob and Lived (2018) and Mafia Democracy (2022).

Personal life 
Franzese has been married twice. Franzese lives in Newport Beach, California with his wife, Camille Garcia, and their seven children. Franzese met his current wife in 1984, while shooting the film Knights of the City in Ft. Lauderdale, Florida.  His wife, a Christian, also influenced him in his decision to leave the mob.

In 2010, Franzese's brother John Franzese Jr. testified against his father Sonny Franzese in a racketeering case after wearing a wire during conversations with his father. Michael described his brother as a "nobody in the mob life", and that his father felt "sick" that his son had "betrayed him like this". His father was sentenced to eight years in prison, and was released from prison in 2017 at the age of 100, dying three years later.

References

External links

  
 
 Michael Franzese on YouTube

1951 births
Living people
Colombo crime family
Criminals from Brooklyn
American gangsters of Italian descent
People acquitted of racketeering
People convicted of racketeering
American motivational speakers
American Christians
American writers of Italian descent
Organized crime memoirists
American memoirists
Non-fiction writers about organized crime in the United States
American male non-fiction writers
Film producers from New York (state)
American YouTubers
Hofstra University alumni